Okanagan Lake Shopping Centre is a shopping mall located in West Kelowna, British Columbia, Canada.

References 

Shopping malls in the Okanagan